GLOW is an American comedy-drama television series created by Liz Flahive and Carly Mensch for Netflix. The series revolves around a fictionalization of the characters and gimmicks of the 1980s syndicated women's professional wrestling circuit, the Gorgeous Ladies of Wrestling (or GLOW) founded by David McLane.

The first season consists of 10 episodes and was released on June 23, 2017. On August 10, 2017, Netflix renewed the series for a second season of 10 episodes, which premiered on June 29, 2018. The series was renewed on August 20, 2018 for a third season, which premiered on August 9, 2019. On September 20, 2019, the series was renewed for a fourth and final season. However, in October 2020, that decision was reversed by Netflix, and the final season was canceled due to the COVID-19 pandemic.

Series overview

Episodes

Season 1 (2017)

Season 2 (2018)

Season 3 (2019)

References

External links
 GLOW on Netflix
 

GLOW